Sabalan Metro Station is a station in Tehran Metro Line 2. It is located in the junction of Ayatollah Madani Avenue and Sabalan Street. It is between Fadak Metro Station and Shahid Madani Metro Station.

References

Tehran Metro stations